Kalafat can refer to the following villages in Turkey:

 Kalafat, Biga
 Kalafat, Bigadiç
 Kalafat, Çanakkale
 Kalafat, Cide

See also
 Calafat, a city in Romania